Namibia first participated at the Olympic Games in 1992, and has sent athletes to compete in every Summer Olympic Games since then.  Namibia has never participated in the Winter Olympic Games.

Namibian athletes have won a total of five medals, all silver medals. Frankie Fredericks won four medals in athletics across two Olympics.

The Namibian National Olympic Committee was created in 1990 and recognized by the International Olympic Committee in 1991.

Medal tables

Medals by sport

List of medalists

See also
 List of flag bearers for Namibia at the Olympics
 :Category:Olympic competitors for Namibia
 Namibia at the Paralympics

External links